Munger Assembly constituency is an assembly constituency in Munger district in the Indian state of Bihar. In 2015 Bihar Legislative Assembly election, Munger will be one of the 36 seats to have VVPAT enabled electronic voting machines.

Members of Legislative Assembly

Election results

2015

2020

References

External links
 

Assembly constituencies of Bihar
Politics of Munger district